Chthonocephalus tomentellus is an annual herb in the family Asteraceae. It is endemic to Western Australia, occurring in saline depressions. Yellow flowers are produced between August and November (late winter to late spring) in its native range. 
The species was first formally described as Lachnothalamus tomentellus  by botanist  Ferdinand von Mueller in 1863 in Fragmenta Phytographiae Australiae  from a type specimen collected near the mouth of the Murchison River.

References

Gnaphalieae
Asterales of Australia
Eudicots of Western Australia
Taxa named by Ferdinand von Mueller